Harold M. Koch (1932 – August 15, 1995) was an American Roman Catholic priest from Chicago who defected to the Soviet Union in 1966. His defection, which was included in a Soviet propaganda broadcast, was in protest to the Vietnam war. However he decided to return to the United States three months later saying he wanted to get married. He did, to a Jeanette Neager. While in the Soviet Union he was provided an apartment in Moscow.

From 1958 to 1963 he served the Roman Catholic Archdiocese of Chicago, leaving when pushed out because of psychiatric problems.

Koch died on August 15, 1995 due to liver failure.

References

External links 
Harold Koch on Defecting to Russia - HD
Defector Assails Johnson Policies

1932 births
American Roman Catholic priests
American defectors to the Soviet Union
Living people